Ahven may refer to:

 Ahven-class minesweeper, a ship class of the Finnish Navy
 Mati Ahven (born 1943), Estonian engineer and mechanic
 Viktor Ahven (born 1929), Finnish wrestler